Lonesome Luke's Lovely Rifle is a 1917 American short comedy film featuring Harold Lloyd.

Cast
 Harold Lloyd as Lonesome Luke
 Snub Pollard 
 Bebe Daniels

See also
 Harold Lloyd filmography

External links

1917 films
1917 short films
American silent short films
1917 comedy films
American black-and-white films
Films directed by Hal Roach
Silent American comedy films
Lonesome Luke films
Films with screenplays by H. M. Walker
American comedy short films
1910s American films